Bethune-Hill v. Virginia State Bd. of Elections, 580 U.S. ___ (2017), was a case in which the United States Supreme Court evaluated whether Virginia's legislature the Virginia General Assembly violated the Equal Protection Clause of the Fourteenth Amendment to the United States Constitution by considering racial demographics when drawing the boundaries of twelve of the state's legislative districts. 

The case involves the maps drawn up by the Republican-controlled state legislative bodies to try to maintain their majority within the state. The initial decision by the United States District Court for the Eastern District of Virginia found the 2011 redistricting map to be racially gerrymandered. The state challenged to the Supreme Court, which found the District Court had misapplied a standard and remanded portions of the case while affirming other parts of the decision. On rehearing, the District Court again found the redistricting to be unconstitutional, and the state of Virginia declined to challenge the result. A second petition for the Supreme Court was initiated by the Virginia House of Delegates, appealing the new District Court ruling. The Supreme Court accepted the petition but summarily ruled that the House of Delegates did not have sufficient standing to challenge in lieu of the state itself.

Background
Virginia has historically been a Republican-favored state but in the last few decades, has seen a shift towards the left. The Republicans have managed to hold slim margins in their state legislation despite not having won an election since 2009.

This case arose when Virginia voters filed a lawsuit to challenge the twelve new legislative districts, drawn up by the controlling Republican legislative bodies in 2011, "as unconstitutional racial gerrymanders." At trial, a three-Judge panel from the United States District Court for the Eastern District of Virginia ruled that race was not a predominant factor in the creation of eleven of the districts; the panel "held that race predominates only where there is an 'actual conflict between traditional redistricting criteria and race'". The three-judge panel also held that race was a predominant factor for the boundaries of the remaining district, "District 75," though the panel held that the legislature did not violate the Equal Protection Clause when drawing the district "because the legislature's use of race was narrowly tailored to a compelling state interest." The Panel explained "that a 55% racial target  was necessary in District 75 to avoid diminishing the ability of black voters to elect their preferred candidates, which at the time would have violated §5 of the Voting Rights Act of 1965." New court-ordered redistricting maps were prepared, which gave the Democrats the edge in future elections.

Opinion of the Court
In an opinion written by Justice Anthony Kennedy, the Supreme Court held that the district court applied an incorrect legal standard when it determined that race did not predominate in eleven of the twelve legislative districts. However, the Court also held that the district court correctly determined that legislature did not violate the constitution when drawing the boundaries of District 75. The Supreme Court remanded the case back to the district court for further proceedings.

Aftermath
Following the remanded hearings, in which the District Court still held that the redistricting was an unconstitutional gerrymandering, the state of Virginia issued a statement that it would not seek additional judicial relief. However, the Virginia House of Representatives instead attempted to appeal on behalf of the state, creating a new case, Virginia House of Delegates v. Bethune-Hill (Docket 18-281). This appeal was directly petitioned to the Supreme Court, which accepted  the case for appeal. On June 17, 2019, the Supreme Court issued its ruling, dismissing the appeal on the basis that the House lacked standing to take over the case from the State. In the 5–4 decision, Justice Ginsburg stated that the House, acting alone from Virginia's Senate, did not have standing either directly as a party to the case, or to represent the State's interests.

See also
 List of United States Supreme Court cases
 Lists of United States Supreme Court cases by volume
 List of United States Supreme Court cases by the Roberts Court
 OneVirginia2021

References

External links
 
 Slip opinion for Virginia House of Delegates v. Bethune-Hill

United States Supreme Court cases
United States Supreme Court cases of the Roberts Court
2017 in United States case law
United States electoral redistricting case law